Astrothelium sexloculatum is a species of corticolous (bark-dwelling), crustose lichen in the family Trypetheliaceae. Found in Guyana and Papua New Guinea, it was formally described as a new species in 2016 by Dutch lichenologist André Aptroot. The lichen has a smooth and somewhat shiny, pale yellowish-grey thallus with a cortex and a thin (up to 0.1 mm wide) black prothallus line. Both the thallus and the pseudostromata contain lichexanthone, a lichen product that causes these structures to fluoresce yellow when lit with a long-wavelength UV light. The species epithet sexloculatum refers to the ascospores, which are divided into six chambers (locules) by five transverse septa.

References

sexloculatum
Lichen species
Lichens described in 2016
Lichens of Guyana
Lichens of New Guinea
Taxa named by André Aptroot